Dorn is a German black metal band.

It was founded as a solo project in 1998 by Roberto Liebig, the ex-keyboardist of pagan metal band Riger.  Dorn's 2000 debut album Falschheit was recorded in the studios of CCP Records in Linz, with Liebig playing all of the instruments himself.

The album received good reviews, so Liebig was signed by CCP Records and left his role in Riger. Falschheit was followed by Brennende Kälte in 2001 and Schatten der Vergangenheit in 2002.  For the 2004 album Suriel, Liebig was joined by Michael Werber, Sebastian Ziem, Lars, and Ira.  With this lineup, Dorn toured in Germany, but in 2005 Lars and Ira left the band. In October 2006, Liebig and the other two remaining band members recorded the album Spiegel der Unendlichkeit, which was released on February 23, 2007.

Discography 
2000: Falschheit
2001: Brennende Kälte
2002: Schatten der Vergangenheit
2004: Suriel
2007: Spiegel der Unendlichkeit

External links
 Official website—in German, with album samples and more information on the band.
 
 Band MySpace Page—contains an extended biography in both English and German.
 Dorn at Encyclopaedia Metallum

Symphonic black metal musical groups
Viking metal musical groups
German black metal musical groups